Eagleton Village is a census-designated place (CDP) in Blount County, Tennessee, United States. The population was 5,052 at the 2010 census. It is included in the Knoxville, Tennessee Metropolitan Statistical Area.

Geography
Eagleton Village is located at  (35.789592, -83.943085).

Demographics

2020 census

As of the 2020 United States census, there were 5,393 people, 2,302 households, and 1,563 families residing in the CDP.

2000 census
As of the census of 2000, there were 4,883 people, 2,133 households, and 1,426 families residing in the CDP. The population density was 1,524.5 people per square mile (589.2/km2). There were 2,291 housing units at an average density of 715.2/sq mi (276.4/km2). The racial makeup of the CDP was 95.97% White, 2.23% African American, 0.31% Native American, 0.45% Asian, 0.25% from other races, and 0.80% from two or more races. Hispanic or Latino of any race were 1.11% of the population.

There were 2,133 households, out of which 28.6% had children under the age of 18 living with them, 50.0% were married couples living together, 12.5% had a female householder with no husband present, and 33.1% were non-families. 29.8% of all households were made up of individuals, and 13.2% had someone living alone who was 65 years of age or older. The average household size was 2.28 and the average family size was 2.79.

In the CDP, the population was spread out, with 22.3% under the age of 18, 7.8% from 18 to 24, 30.3% from 25 to 44, 22.9% from 45 to 64, and 16.7% who were 65 years of age or older. The median age was 38 years. For every 100 females, there were 87.3 males. For every 100 females age 18 and over, there were 84.4 males.

The median income for a household in the CDP was $29,888, and the median income for a family was $34,487. Males had a median income of $26,754 versus $22,431 for females. The per capita income for the CDP was $17,870. About 9.6% of families and 13.1% of the population were below the poverty line, including 20.3% of those under age 18 and 8.3% of those age 65 or over.

References

Census-designated places in Blount County, Tennessee
Census-designated places in Tennessee
Knoxville metropolitan area